This is a list of slums in Mauritania.

Arafat, Mauritania
Dar-Naim
El Mina, Mauritania
Sebkha, Mauritania
Toujouonine

See also

 List of slums

Slums
Mauritania
Mauritania